Ivanovo Municipality is a municipality (obshtina) in Ruse Province, Central-North Bulgaria, located along the right bank of Danube river in the Danubian Plain. It is named after its administrative centre - the village of Ivanovo.

The area is best known with the Rock-hewn Churches of Ivanovo which is an UNESCO World Heritage Site. Other important sights in the municipality include the medieval Bulgarian fortress of Cherven, which reached its apogee in the 13th and 14th centuries and features a well-preserved keep from the 14th century, and the Rusenski Lom Nature Park.

The population is predominantly Bulgarian (83.5%), with Turkish (9.4%), Romani (5.9%) and other minorities (1.2%, mostly Tatars in the village of Trastenik).

The main road E85 crosses the area from south to north, connecting the province centre of Ruse with the cities of Veliko Tarnovo and respectively Pleven and Sofia.

Settlements 

Ivanovo Municipality includes the following 13 places (towns are shown in bold):

Demography 
The following table shows the change of the population during the last four decades. Since 1992 Ivanovo Municipality has comprised the former municipality of Shtraklevo and the numbers in the table reflect this unification.

Religion 
According to the latest Bulgarian census of 2011, the religious composition, among those who answered the optional question on religious identification, was the following:

See also
Provinces of Bulgaria
Municipalities of Bulgaria
List of cities and towns in Bulgaria

References

External links
 Ivanovo municipality website 

Municipalities in Ruse Province